Tim Martin is the Director of the Human Rights Campaign group Act Now. As a former British humanitarian aid worker who worked in Sri Lanka, Martin founded Act Now with fellow aid workers after seeing human rights violations and mass killing in Sri Lanka against Tamils. In 2009, Martin went on a 21-day fast outside British Parliament to protest against the killing of Tamils in Sri Lanka.

References

External links
Tim Martin Interview

British activists
Living people
Year of birth missing (living people)